Grandson may refer to:

Grandson (son of a child)
Grandson (musician), a Canadian-American rock artist
Grandson, Switzerland, a municipality in Switzerland
Grandson (district), a district in Switzerland
Battle of Grandson, part of the Burgundian Wars, fought near the Swiss municipality